Robert Waln (February 22, 1765January 24, 1836) was a United States representative from Pennsylvania. Born in Philadelphia in the Province of Pennsylvania, he received a limited schooling, engaged in mercantile pursuits and in East India and China trade, was a member of the Pennsylvania Legislature for several years, and was a member of the city council of Philadelphia, serving as president of the select council.

Waln was elected as a Federalist to the Fifth Congress to fill the vacancy caused by the death of John Swanwick. He was reelected to the Sixth Congress and served from December 3, 1798, to March 3, 1801. He became interested in the operation of ironworks and during the War of 1812 erected a cotton factory in Trenton, New Jersey. He served as president of the Philadelphia Insurance Co. and as a trustee of the University of Pennsylvania. He died in Philadelphia; interment was in Arch Street Friends Meeting House Burial Ground.

References

External links

 The Smith-Waln Family Papers, including financial papers and other documents belonging to Robert Waln, are available for research use at the Historical Society of Pennsylvania.

1765 births
1836 deaths
University of Pennsylvania
Philadelphia City Council members
Politicians from Philadelphia
People of colonial Pennsylvania
Federalist Party members of the United States House of Representatives from Pennsylvania